There are other places called Meelick in County Clare and County Mayo.
Meelick (Míleac in Irish), also Milic, is a townland on the River Shannon in Ireland. It lies approximately 4 km southeast of Eyrecourt in County Galway.It is best known for its walkway that connects to Lusmagh (Offaly). It also holds the oldest church still in use in Ireland at 608 years old given papal permission and built in 1414 AD (St. Francis Friary) it is also within the Parish of Clonfert which is home to the madonna statue Our Lady of Clonfert. Clonfert is the head of its diocese with its headquarters home to Most Rev. Bishop Michael Duignan, St. Brendans Presbytery Loughrea. It is home to the oldest hurling club in Ireland which was founded in 1884. It has a little pub 10 yards from The Church known locally as “George’s/The Shop” It holds a kayaking festival each year after the boating season halts to its winter end with a great quay half way between Portumna and Banagher home to SilverLine Cruisers, CarrickCraft and Emerald Star-line. It holds a car rally in association with Galway Rally ever few years. Its current Parish Priest (2021) is REV.Fr.Declan McInerney PP.

Oldest Catholic Church in use 

Meelick has the oldest Irish Roman Catholic church, with continuous use since 1414 AD. Founded as a Franciscan abbey, the church and sacristy are still in use today. The ruins include traces of the transept chapel, friary and small mill. 
Papal permission for Meelick friary was granted by John XXII in 1414. The last friar of Meelick was Fr. Bonaventure Francis Reynolds.  When he died in November 1852, there was no friar available to replace him. Since then the church has been maintained for weekly services.
The Meelick Triduum still exists in early August when the Franciscans return to their abbey.

Castle
An Anglo Norman de Burgo (Burke) Castle was erected close to the church, in the fields to the north of the church. The earthworks relating to this castle can still be seen. The location was chosen because Meelick was one of the few traditional crossing points where the river Shannon could be forded.

Recreation 

Meelick is a location for fishing, primarily salmon and wild brown trout. The river here is wide (over 1.5 km from bank to bank at its broadest point) and has a number of islands, weirs, pools and streams. There are islands separating an artificial cut on the County Offaly bank with the main River Shannon at Meelick on the County Galway bank. It has a very small spring salmon run from April into mid-May. Summer salmon arrive generally from mid-June. Runs are moderate and variable from year to year.

Meelick is on the route of the Hymany Way, part of the Beara-Breifne long distance walking and cycling trail between the Beara Peninsula in County Cork and Blacklion in County Cavan.

All-Ireland Senior Hurling Championship 1887 
In 1887 Meelick were one of the first teams to compete for the All-Ireland Senior Hurling Championship, the first national championship of the game of hurling ever held in Ireland. Representing County Galway in the final, Meelick were defeated by Thurles, representing County Tipperary. The game was held in Birr in County Offaly in front of a crowd of 5,000. Patrick Madden, captain of the Meelick side, is commemorated with a plaque on the gable end of his birthplace and lifetime home in the village.

Meelick-Eyrecourt is the name of the local Gaelic Athletic Association club today.

Meelick Lock 
Meelick lock, also known as Victoria Lock is one of the busiest locks on the Shannon Navigation. It is 43.4m. long by 12m. wide. The rise of water levels is 2.4m. It was built by the Shannon Commissioners in Limestone in the mid 19th. century to address a shallows and change of level in the river. The Engineer in Charge was Thomas Rhodes. The stone used for the Lock was excavated from the new canal bed.  The canal serving the new lock was built in 1841 by William MacKenzie Contractor. When the Lock works were being undertaken the workmen went on strike- looking for more pay. They wanted 1s. 3d. per day. The lock was completed in 1843. Originally the gates were made of French oak and planked in northern pine. The lock replaces the earlier Hamilton Lock on the Clonahenoge Canal.

Defences
The river crossing at this location has a long history and is therefore guarded by defences, including the de Burgo castle mentioned above. Meelick Martello Tower was constructed along with other Martello towers by the government about 1811 on Moran Island at Clonahenoge on the County Offaly side of the River Shannon was built to protect Leinster from a Napoleonic invasion and to control the river crossing at Keelogue. It reinforced existing defences at Keelogue Battery on Innishirkeigh Island. Island. Unusually the tower is cam-shaped with three gun emplacements.

Annalistic references

From The Annals of the Four Masters:

 M1557.7. A hosting was made by the Lord Justice to banish the O'Conors of Offaly from Meelick, after having heard that they were there; and he conveyed and carried great guns to Athlone, and from thence sent them in boats to Meelick, while he himself marched his army through Bealach-an-fhothair, and by Lurgan-Lusmhaighe. He afterwards took Meelick and Breac-chluain, and slew Donough, the son of Colla, together with others of the warders. The entire territory was plundered and ravaged on that occasion. The sons of Melaghlin Balbh were banished from the territory, together with the insurgents. The Lord Justice left an English constable at Meelick, i.e. Master Francis, and took hostages from the two O'Maddens, namely, from Melaghlin Modhardha and Breasal, and other hostages from Mac Coghlan, namely, his son and others: and thus was Siol-Anmchadha taken, and it is not easy to state or enumerate all that was destroyed on that expedition. Three weeks before Lammas that expedition was made.

See also
 List of abbeys and priories in Ireland (County Galway)
 List of towns and villages in Ireland

References

Townlands of County Galway
Populated places on the River Shannon